Rovers FC is a Seychellois association football club based in Victoria that currently competes in the Seychelles Championship. The current manager is Kosta Todorovic.

History
Rovers FC was founded in 2018 and began playing in the Seychelles 3rd Division. The club was the champions of the 2nd Division and earned promotion to the 1st Division, the second-tier league of football in the Seychelles, following the 2019–2020 season.

In November 2020 it was announced that Rovers FC had signed a major 2-year sponsorship deal with the Absa Group.

Honours
 Seychelles Championship 2
 Winners: 2020
 Seychelles FA Cup 
 Semi-finalists: 2020

Current players

References

External links
Official Facebook
Official Website

Football clubs in Seychelles